Princess Maryam Begum Naim (2 November 1936 – 25 December 2021) was an Afghan princess. She was the second daughter of King Mohammed Zahir Shah and Queen Humaira Begum. 

Princess Maryam Begum was educated at Malali School, Kabul. The princess was working as a nurse when her father ruled the country.  

Princess Maryam Begum died at home in Kabul, Afghanistan on 25 December 2021, at the age of 85. She was buried at Maranjan Hill in Kabul, Afghanistan.

Issue 
 Sardar Nadir Khan Naim (born in 1965 in Munich, Bavaria, Germany).

Ancestry

References

1936 births
2021 deaths
Place of birth missing
Afghan princesses
Barakzai dynasty
People from Kabul
British people of Afghan descent
Daughters of kings